Lagemann is a German surname and can refer to the following people:

 Ramana Lagemann, an American rally car driver
 Rainer Lagemann, a German metal sculptor and photographer
 Hanns Hermann Lagemann (1924–2003), a German politician (CDU), member of the Landtag of North Rhine-Westphalia
 Inge Lagemann (1944–2014), a German politician (SPD), member of the Landtag of North Rhine-Westphalia
 Johann Jakob Lagemann (1696–1766), a German gunsmith famous for making breech-loading wheellock sporting rifles in Vollmarshausen, Germany
 Sigrid Lagemann (1924–1992), a German actress and voice actress

Surnames